Rosa 'Cupcake',  (aka SPIcup) is a miniature rose, bred by Mark Spies in 1981. The cultivar was the winner of an American Rose Society Award of Excellence in 1983.

Description
'Cupcake' is a compact,  bushy shrub, 1 to 2 ft (30—60 cm) in height with a 1 to 2 ft (30—60 cm) spread.  Blooms are 2—3 in (5—7 cm) in diameter, high-centered with a double (17-25 petals) bloom form. The flowers are a clear, pretty pink, darker pink in cool weather and paler pink in warmer weather. Blooms have a light, sweet scent. The flowers are borne singly or in small clusters and last a long time. The plant is a good repeater, and blooms continuously from spring through fall. The foliage is glossy and gray-green. The plant does well in USDA zone 5 and warmer. 'Cupcake' is a good container rose.

References

Cupcake